The Netherlands men's national under-18 ice hockey team is controlled by the Netherlands Ice Hockey Association and represents the Netherlands in international under-18 ice hockey competitions. The Netherlands plays in Division II of the IIHF World U18 Championships, and will host the 2012 IIHF World U18 Championships Division II Group A in Heerenveen.

2012 IIHF World U18 Championships

The Netherlands hosted the 2012 IIHF World U18 Championships Division II Group A in Heerenveen. All games were played at Thialf.

Roster
From the Nederlandse IJshockey Bond

Current squad

The following players were named as part of the 2012 IIHF World U18 Championships roster.

Results
Recent results within last 12 months and upcoming fixtures.

References

External links
Nederlandse IJshockey Bond 
Netherlands at the IIHF
National Teams of Ice Hockey

ice hockey
National under-18 ice hockey teams